Jean-Christophe "Pitof" Comar (born 4 July 1957) is a retired French visual effects supervisor and director notable for Vidocq and Catwoman.

Early life 
Pitof was born Jean-Christophe Comar on 4 July 1957 in Paris. From an early age, he harboured an interest in photography. As a teenager, he built a photography studio in the basement of his parents' house and landed a job as a photographer's assistant.

Career 
Pitof entered the film industry in 1976 as an assistant director and film editor. He branched out into visual effects in 1986 when he co-founded Duran Duboi, a post-production studio. He continued working as a visual effects supervisor and assistant director until 2001, when his directorial debut, the supernatural thriller film Vidocq was released. The film was notable for being the first motion picture to be shot using entirely digital cinematography.

In 2004, Pitof made his English-language debut with the Hollywood film Catwoman, starring Halle Berry and Sharon Stone. The film was critically panned, and is considered one of the worst movies of all time, and Pitof was awarded the Razzie Award for Worst Director for the film.

Pitof was set to direct the US-Chinese co-production Empires of the Deep although he eventually dropped out.

Filmography 
Director
Vidocq (2001)
Catwoman (2004)
Fire and Ice: The Dragon Chronicles (2008) (TV movie)

Writer
Vidocq (2001)
Le pistolet (2003)

Second unit director
Alien Resurrection (1997)

Producer
Closer Apart (2012)
The Coin (2012)
The Activist (2013)

Visual effects supervisor
Asterix & Obelix Take On Caesar (1999)
The Messenger: The Story of Joan of Arc (1999)
Alien Resurrection (1997)
Didier (1997)
Fantome avec Chauffeur (1996)
Beaumarchais (1996)
Fallait pas (1996)
The City of Lost Children (1995)
Happiness is in the Field (1995)
Ma Femme me Quitte (1995)
Dead Tired (1994)
The Daughter of d'Artagnan (1994)
Blue Helmet (1994)
Giorgino (1994)
Montparnasse Pondichery (1994)
Cash-Cash (1994)
The Visitors (1993)
The Thirst for Gold (1993)
Fanfan & Alexandre (1993)
Metisse (1993)
My Name Is Victor (1993)
 (1992)
Delicatessen (1991)

Awards and accolades 
2005
Kids' Choice Award (nominated) for Catwoman
CNOMA Award for Best Make-Up for Catwoman
Golden Raspberry Award for Worst Director for Catwoman
World Stunt Award (nominated) for Catwoman

2001
Silver Grand Prize of European Fantasy Film at Fantasporto for Vidocq
International Fantasy Film Award for Best Special Effects at Fantasporto for Vidocq
International Fantasy Film Award for Best Film (nominated) at Fantasporto for Vidocq
Best Film at Sitges for Vidocq
Citizen Kane Award to the Director Revelation at Sitges for Vidocq
Best Visual Effects at Sitges for Vidocq
Best Makeup Effects at Sitges for Vidocq
Best Original Score at Sitges for Vidocq

1999
Solutions Productions Achievement in Post-Production Award for Asterix & Obelix vs Caesar

1998
Saturn Award for Best Special Effects (nominated) for Alien Resurrection

1997
Imagina Award for Best Visual Effects (second prize) for Alien Resurrection

1996
Imagina Golden Teapot for "Homage to Jesse and Carl"
MIFED Golden Prize for "Homage to Jesse and Carl"
Master of Visual Effects in Paris for "Orangina the flipper"

1995
Best Use of Visual Effects at Spotitalia for "Mulino Bianco"
 "Chevalier des Arts et des Lettres" (One of the French highest cultural honors awarded by the Minister of Culture)

1994
Technical Grand Prize at the Cannes Film Festival for Dead Tired

References

External links 
 
 
 Pitof at ECI Global Talent Management

1957 births
Living people
French film directors
French male screenwriters
French screenwriters